Brit Vingelsgaard Ryen (born 24 November 1944) is a Norwegian politician for the Centre Party.

She served as a deputy representative to the Parliament of Norway from Hedmark during the terms 1985–1989 and 1989–1993. In total she met during 9 days of parliamentary session.

References

1944 births
Living people
People from Tolga, Norway
Deputy members of the Storting
Centre Party (Norway) politicians
Hedmark politicians
Norwegian women in politics
Place of birth missing (living people)
Women members of the Storting